Bale Gasegar is one of the woredas in Oromia Regional State of Ethiopia. It is part of the Arsi Zone. It was separated from Seru woreda.

Demographics 
The 207 national census reported a total population for this woreda of 73,952, of whom 36,419 were men and 37,533 were women; 5,913 or 8% of its population were urban dwellers. The majority of the inhabitants said they were Muslim, with 50.14% of the population reporting they observed this belief, while 49.52% of the population practised Ethiopian Orthodox Christianity.

Notes 

Districts of Oromia Region